Almost Grown is an American drama television series about a couple, played by Tim Daly and Eve Gordon, whose lives are explored during three time periods of their lives. The series was well received by critics, but aired for only 9 out of 13 episodes from November 27, 1988, until February 20, 1989, on CBS due to low ratingsrunning in the same timeslot as Monday Night Football and The NBC Monday Movie.
The series was co-created by David Chase.

Cast and characters
Tim Daly — Norman Foley
Eve Gordon — Suzie Long Foley
Marcia Cross — Lesley Foley
Rita Taggart — Joan Foley
Michael Alldredge — Frank Foley
Anita Gillette — Vi Long
Richard Schaal — Dick Long
Albert Macklin — Joey Long
Ocean Hellman — Anya Foley
Nathaniel Moreau — Jackson Foley
Raffi Diblasio — Jackson Foley

Episodes

DVD
To date, the series has not been released on DVD.

Awards
The list of awards and nominations for Almost Grown

References

External links
 
   Jeff Baron's summary page on Almost Grown (with cast pictures)

1988 American television series debuts
1989 American television series endings
1980s American drama television series
CBS original programming
Television series by Universal Television
English-language television shows
Television shows set in Colorado